Fquih Ben Salah is a province in the Moroccan region of Béni Mellal-Khénifra. Its population in 2014 is 502,827.

Administrative divisions

References

 
Provinces of Béni Mellal-Khénifra